Étienne Fidy Rasoanaivo (born 22 September 1968 in Madagascar) is a Malagasy football coach and former footballer.

Mauritius

Coach of Curepipe Starlight SC, Rasoanaivo aimed for a treble of trophies in 2013, an achievement unparalleled in the club's recent history. He was then Curepipe Starlight's coach again in 2015 but was dismissed as the board were not satisfied with results.

Commenting on the level of the professional Mauritian Premier League in 2016, the Malagasy trainer stated that the league should make changes for the next season and that teams receive more funding to pay their squad.

Personal life

Married to Jolene, a Mauritian woman, since 1997, Rasoanaivo is the father of three children: two daughters and one son.

He is the brother of Rado Rasoanaivo.

References

External links 
 FIFA.com Profile

Malagasy expatriate footballers
Association football midfielders
Expatriate footballers in Mauritius
1968 births
Malagasy footballers
Madagascar international footballers
Living people
Expatriate football managers in Mauritius
Malagasy football managers
Malagasy expatriate sportspeople in Mauritius